John Oroo Oyioka (died 15 February 2021, in Kisumu) was a Kenyan politician who served as a Member of Parliament for the Peoples Democratic Party from 2017 till his death in 2021 from COVID-19.

References

Date of birth missing
Year of birth missing
Place of birth missing
2021 deaths
Members of the National Assembly (Kenya)
Deaths from the COVID-19 pandemic in Kenya